William Neil (22 May 1939 – 22 September 2014) was a Scottish footballer who represented Great Britain at the 1960 Summer Olympics. Neil, who played as a centre half, played in the Scottish Football League for Airdrieonians and Queen's Park between 1956 and 1972. Neil holds the record for the player with the most amateur caps. He died in 2014.

References

1939 births
2014 deaths
Scottish footballers
Airdrieonians F.C. (1878) players
Scottish Football League players
Footballers at the 1960 Summer Olympics
Olympic footballers of Great Britain
Association football central defenders
Queen's Park F.C. players
Footballers from Airdrie, North Lanarkshire
Scotland youth international footballers
Scotland amateur international footballers